Valjevo Sports Hall is an indoor arena in Valjevo, built in 1972. It has a capacity of 2500 people. It is a home arena of basketball team KK Metalac.

References

See also
List of indoor arenas in Serbia

Sport in Valjevo
Indoor arenas in Serbia
Basketball venues in Serbia
Sports venues completed in 1972
1972 establishments in Serbia